Koonoomoo  is a town in northern Victoria, Australia.

The town is probably best known for its strawberry farms and the Big Strawberry, part of an Australian trend to build large roadside attractions. Also it is home to the Cobram State Forest which attracts many visitors.

Koonoomoo had a Post Office only for a brief period in 1917. Nearby Mywee Post Office to the west on the Shepparton railway line was open between 1911 and 1974.

On 21 March 2013 the town was struck by a violent EF4 tornado.

References

External links
 

Towns in Victoria (Australia)
Shire of Moira